Fjallabyggð is a municipality located in northern Iceland. The former municipalities of Ólafsfjörður and Siglufjörður joined to form it in 2006.

References

External links
 
 Official web page in English

Municipalities of Iceland
Northeastern Region (Iceland)